Len Goodman's Partners in Rhyme was a British television series hosted by Len Goodman, which began airing on 19 August 2017 on BBC One. The show was created by Matt Edmondson and was made by Panda TV and AOP for the BBC. The show involved guessing rhymes from animated scenes (by company Creative Nuts) shown to the contestants; the two contestants were paired up with two celebrities and whoever had the most points went through to the final round to win a holiday.

Reception
The show received generally poor reviews from critics. Stuart Heritage writing in The Guardian described it as "a terrible toddler's drawing of a show" and a "fermented kaleidoscope of dung".

References

External links

2010s British game shows
2017 British television series debuts
2017 British television series endings
BBC television game shows
English-language television shows
Television series by All3Media